is a 2016 Japanese-animated original net animation series produced by OLM and released on YouTube by The Pokémon Company. Similar to the 2013 anime television film, Pokémon Origins, the series consists of several short stories inspired by Nintendo's Pokémon video game series (from Generations I to VI), as opposed to its main television series. A total of 18 episodes were produced, and were originally released in English on YouTube between September 16, 2016 and December 23, 2016. Japanese episodes have also aired via YouTube.

Episode list

References

External links 
 
 

2016 anime ONAs
Anime television series based on video games
OLM, Inc.
Generations